Borirane is a heterocyclic organic compound with the formula C2H4BH.  This colourless, flammable gas is the simplest borirane, a three-membered ring consisting of two carbon and one boron atom. It can be viewed as a structural analog of aziridine, with boron replacing the nitrogen atom of aziridine.  Borirane is isomeric with ethylideneborane.

This compound has five isomers.

References 

Boron heterocycles
Gases
Three-membered rings